Best Air was an airline of Bangladesh with both domestic and international destination, a subsidiary of Best Aviation. The company was formed in 2007 as a joint venture between Best Aviation and a Kuwait-based company, Aqeeq Aviation Holding which controls a 70% share of the airline. It started operations in January 2008 from Dhaka's Shahjalal International Airport. Best Air suspended its operations in 2009, due to extraordinarily high fuel costs. Best Air had announced that they have received a large investment from Destiny Group LTD of Bangladesh and will restart operations on 26 March 2011, but did not. They intended to re-enter the domestic market with three brand new ATR 72 aircraft. Plans called for the acquisition of three A320 aircraft later in the year, followed by the A330 or B777 for long haul routes in the near future.

There was also an airline in the U.S. operating scheduled passenger jet service during the 1980s which used the name Best Airlines.

History
Best Air's parent company Best Aviation, started operations in 1999 as a Helicopter operator. Best Aviation started its journey as a freighter airline in 2000. Best Aviation has been operating different types of freighter in the Domestic & International Sectors.

Best Air obtained a license in 2006 from the Civil Aviation Authority of Bangladesh to operate passenger service in domestic and international sectors. Best Air started with a B-737 aircraft to operate from Dhaka to one regional domestic destination, Chittagong. Best Air acquired an MD-83 on lease and operated to new destinations such as Dubai, Kuala Lumpur, Singapore and Bangkok. In 2010 Best Aviation sold 80% of its shares in best air to Destiny Multipurpose Co-Operative Society Ltd.

Destinations
Defunct

Fleet

References

External links
Best Air
Best Air Fleet

Defunct airlines of Bangladesh
Airlines established in 1999
Airlines disestablished in 2009
Bangladeshi companies established in 1999
2009 disestablishments in Bangladesh